Katarína Kopúnová (born 26 July 1994) is a Slovak female canoeist who won three medals (one gold) at senior level at the Wildwater Canoeing World Championships.

Biography
Kopúnová was 7th with Viktória Scholczová in the C2 sprint senior final at the 2019 Wildwater Canoeing World Championships.

Achievements

References

External links
 
 

1994 births
Living people
Slovak female canoeists
Sportspeople from Bratislava